New Faces, New Sounds is the debut album by American pianist Kenny Drew recorded and released in 1953 on Blue Note Records as a 10" vinyl.

Track listing

"Yesterdays" (Kern, Harbach) - 5:19
"Stella by Starlight" (Victor Young) - 2:27
"Gloria (Leon René) - 3:31
"Be My Love" (Sammy Cahn, Nicholas Brodzsky) - 2:41
"Lover, Come Back to Me" (Romberg, Hammerstein II) - 3:31
"Everything Happens to Me" (Adair, Dennis) - 4:41
"It Might as Well Be Spring" (Rodgers, Hammerstein II) - 2:47
"Drew's Blues" (Drew) - 2:24

Personnel
Kenny Drew - piano
Art Blakey - drums
Curly Russell - bass

References

Blue Note Records albums
Kenny Drew albums
1953 albums